The New River Subdivision is a railroad line owned by CSX Transportation in the U.S. state of West Virginia. It was formerly part of the CSX Huntington East Division. It became part of the CSX Florence Division on June 20, 2016.

At its south end it continues north from the Alleghany Subdivision and at its north end it continues north as the Kanawha Subdivision.

References

CSX Transportation lines
Rail infrastructure in West Virginia